The Jiaguan Formation is a Lower Cretaceous geologic formation in China. Its lithology is described as consisting of "alternating thick purple red sandstone layers and thin purple red mudstone and siltstone layers, and bottom layers of thick conglomerate" Fossil ornithopod tracks have been reported from the formation.

The known fossil localities include the Lotus Fortress, the type locality of Caririchnium lotus and Wupus agilis ichnotaxa.

See also

 List of dinosaur-bearing rock formations
 List of stratigraphic units with ornithischian tracks
 Ornithopod tracks

Footnotes

References
 Weishampel, David B.; Dodson, Peter; and Osmólska, Halszka (eds.): The Dinosauria, 2nd, Berkeley: University of California Press. 861 pp. .

Lower Cretaceous Series of Asia
Barremian Stage
Aptian Stage
Albian Stage